Kukkarahalli  Lake also called Kukkarhalli Kere (Lake is ‘’kere’’ in local Kannada language), located in the heart of the Mysore city, adjoins the Manasgangotri (University of Mysore), the Kalamandir (Rangyana) and the Central Food Technological Research Institute  (CFTRI) campus (separated by the Hunsur Road). It provides lung-space to the city. Mummadi Krishnaraja Wodeyar (1794–1868) of the Mysore dynasty (Kingdom of Mysore) was responsible for getting the lake created, in the year 1864, to provide water for irrigation to about 4000 ha (10,000 acres) of land outside the city. The Lake also used to be a source of water supply to the city of Mysore but over the years, sewage and excessive land encroachments (mostly illegal) and blockage of water flow sources almost led to the eutrophication of the lake. The University of Mysore and the citizen forums of Mysore continue to make efforts to preserve the lake by implementing several remedial measures. There is a 3.5-km walkway on the periphery of the lake with shaded stone benches for visitors to sit, relax and enjoy the scenic serenity of the lake.

Access 

The lake is located within the Mysore city limits.

Hydrology 
The Lake is ‘J’ shaped. The maximum depth of lake is reported to be . The east–west bund holds water on one side. Sandy loam to clay loam form the dominant geological condition of the Lake. On the northern side another temporary bund hold back the direct flow of waste water into the lake. 

Water quality 
A detailed study of the physico-chemical and bio-chemical parameters of the lake waters carried out in the period 1981-2001 confirmed the deteriorating status of the lake necessitating action for restoration.  There was a high percentage of chemicals but low percentage of total plankton (43%). The activity of chemicals lead to the liberation of extra quantity of cellular products which increased to 53.19%. Lake indicated high productivity of bio-chemical products; with death and decay of algal blooms adding to the biochemical concentration. The lake waters showed high electrolytes, low dissolved oxygen, high phosphate and nitrogen content with abundance of plankton blooms, all of which have contributed to a high degree of eutrophication. The non potability of the water body is indicated by the high degree of faecal contamination with organisms that produce H2S that may include forms of Salmonella, Proteus, Citrobacter and some strains of Klebsiella. The distribution pattern of plank tonic forms, for the decade ending 2001, as per laboratory tests of lake's water samples provides the values of parameters such as the Chlorococcales, Desmids, Diatoms, Blue-greens and Euglenoids, as the biological indicators of water body, as given in table below which testify to the lake's eutrophication status. The numbers indicate the microorganisms present in the sample per litre.

Utility of algal biomass 
Scientists have reported that exploitation of polluted waters which are rich in algal biomass for biotechnological products could be a feasible proposition and that the Phycobiliproteins from algae could be used as sensitive fluorescent dye, as immunochemical reagent and also as efficient fluorochromes in multiple colour analysis.

Bird watching 

The lake was once a big attraction to bird watchers. According to naturalists, about 176 species of birds (a large number of them migratory birds, including birds from Siberia) with 10,000 to 15,000 of them visited the lake during winter to roost.  Organised bird watching expeditions around the lake used to be actively pursued by the Mysore Amateur Naturalists (MAN) Association. In recent years, with the lake getting into a eutrophic state (though since restored), the number of birds visiting the lake has substantially decreased. Now, the number of birds visiting the lake has reduced to about 2,000. They are found to breed in the isolated bird island. The birds now found in the lake (some of the birds are pictured in the gallery) are spot-billed pelicans, little cormorant, painted storks,  openbill storks, Eurasian spoonbills, black-crowned night herons and Oriental darters. BirdLife International has included Kukkarahalli Lake in the list of 38 important Important Bird Areas (IBAs) in the State of Karnataka.

Lake restoration 

During the year 2003–2004, with grants of about US$0.2 million (Rs 91 lakhs) provided by the Asian Development Bank, Karnataka Urban Infrastructure Development Corporation (KUIDFC) in association with the University of Mysore under whose jurisdiction the Lake falls and citizens groups, carried out the restoration works of the lake. In order to effectively reduce the external loading of pollutants and the intervention of wastes into the lake ecosystem the measures implemented have covered the following  with funds provided by the Asian Development Bank.

 Widening of the bund on the southern side,
 Forming a new walkway on the western side for the benefit large number of morning walkers who visit the lake,
 Shaded (bougainvillea creepers) stone benches for visitors to sit, relax and enjoy the scenic serenity of the lake.
 Improving the eastern and the northern pathway,
 Fencing of the lake perimeter
 Lighting arrangement along the southern bund.
 Adopting rainwater harvesting methods to improve the quality and quantity  of water inflows
 Augmenting supply to the lake with fresh water inflow with filtered municipal back water wash
 Adopting aeration of water techniques: boating is one of the methods widely adopted houses - a boating center has been established
 Removal of algae by manual methods
 Engineering methods to clean the boundary conditions of the lake such as desilting and opening of the intake channel
 Ban on immersion of idols during festivals
 Banned dumping of medical waste in the lake
 Increased security system to restrict human influence
 Increased aquaculture
 Stakeholders participation for collective ownership and responsibility to restoration activities

Gallery

References

External links

Mysore Nature|Kukkarahalli Lake
Mysore Nature|Kukkarahalli Lake | Bird Checklist
Mysore Nature|Kukkarahalli Lake | Butterfly Checklist
Kukkarahalli Lake
Full Guide | Kukkarahalli Lake

Lakes of Mysore